Desatoya Peak is the tallest mountain in both the Desatoya Mountains and Churchill County, in Nevada, United States. It ranks forty-third among the most topographically prominent peaks in the state. The peak is on public land administered by the Bureau of Land Management and thus has no access restrictions.

Conservation
The  surrounding Desatoya Peak are part of the Desatoya Mountains Wilderness Study Area which is administered by the Bureau of Land Management. Wildlife that make their home here are mountain lion, mule deer, gray fox, sage grouse, red-tailed hawk, golden eagle and pika.  Additionally, brook trout and Humboldt cutthroat trout live in some of the permanent streams on the flanks of Desatoya Peak.

References 

Mountains of Churchill County, Nevada
Mountains of Lander County, Nevada